The Isle of Wight Festival 2012 was the eleventh revived Isle of Wight Festival, held at Seaclose Park in Newport on the Isle of Wight. The event ran from 21 to 24 June 2012.

The 2012 event was the second under a ten-year deal between the Isle of Wight Council and the promoters Solos. Dubbed the "American Trilogy" by festival organiser John Giddings, it was headlined by Tom Petty and the Heartbreakers, Pearl Jam and Bruce Springsteen & The E Street Band. 

Overnight heavy rain on 21 and 22 June waterlogged the event ground and cars driving on it turned it into a mudbath and had to be towed out by a tractor, resulting in visiting fans' cars waiting to be allowed in backing up the roads all the way back to the ferry dock.

Line up

Main Stage
Friday
Tom Petty and The Heartbreakers
Elbow
Example
Noah & the Whale
Feeder

Saturday
Pearl Jam
Biffy Clyro
Tinie Tempah
Jessie J
Madness
Labrinth
Big Country
James Walsh
Signals

Sunday
Bruce Springsteen & The E Street Band
Noel Gallagher's High Flying Birds
The Vaccines
Band of Skulls
Joan Armatrading
Steve Hackett
The Minutes
Naked Fridays

Big Top
Thursday
Primal Scream
The Stranglers
Penguin Prison

Friday
Groove Armada
Enter Shikari
DJ Fresh Presents FRESH/LIVE
Lana Del Rey
Kelis
Caro Emerald

Saturday
Magnetic Man
Professor Green
Wretch 32
Katy B
Loick Essien
Stooshe
Clement Marfo & The Frontline
Hue and Cry
Boyce Avenue
The Brilliant Things

Sunday
The Darkness
Ash
Pulled Apart By Horses
Black Stone Cherry
The Virgin Marys
Spector
Zulu Winter
The Milk
Switchfoot

Garden Stage
Thursday
 Brit Floyd: The Pink Floyd Tribute Show
Howard Jones
Stackridge
Cerys Matthews
Tensheds

Friday
Crystal Castles
Best Coast
Dry the River
Gretchen Peters
Pronghorn
Boy Genius

Saturday
The Charlatans
Miles Kane
X
Thunderclap Newman
Andrew Roachford
Sadie and the Hot Heads
The Christians
Terry Reid
Tobi (special guest Andy Fraser)
The Real D'Coy
Sofia

Sunday
The Pierces
Christina Perri
Melanie C
Beth Hart
Suzanne Vega
James Walsh
Matt Cardle
Fallulah
Molly McQueen

References

External links
 Isle of Wight Festival official website

2012
2012 in British music
2012 in England
21st century on the Isle of Wight